Atlético Belén is a Peruvian football club based in the city of Moyobamba, San Martín, Peru.

History
Atlético Belén was 2002 Liga Departamental champion.

The club have played at the highest level of Peruvian football on two occasions, from 1989 Torneo Descentralizado until 1990 Torneo Descentralizado when was relegated.

In the 2002 Copa Perú, the club reached the Regional Stage, but was eliminated by Colegio Nacional Iquitos, while in the 2010 Copa Perú, the club got through to the Departamental Stage, but was defeated by Unión Comercio in the final.

Honours

Regional
Liga Departamental de San Martín:
Winners (2): 1966, 2002
Runner-up (1): 2010

Liga Provincial de Moyobamba:
Winners (5): 1966, 1968, 1974, 2002, 2009
Runner-up (2): 2010, 2013

Liga Distrital de Moyobamba:
Winners (3): 2001, 2008, 2013

See also
List of football clubs in Peru
Peruvian football league system

References

Football clubs in Peru
Association football clubs established in 1960